Meeting the Masters is collection of  45 short stories by Nobel prize-winning author Mo Yan. It was split into two parts with the second half being subtitled "Dating with the Master".

Stories include:

 "Fire Burning Flower Basket"
 "Moonlight"
 "Big Mouth"
 "Lover's Lover"
 "Fiction 9"

References 

Works by Mo Yan
2012 short story collections
Chinese short story collections
Chinese contemporary short stories